Charles-Joseph Panckoucke (26 November 1736 – 19 December 1798) was a French writer and publisher. He was responsible for numerous influential publications of the era, including the literary journal Mercure de France and the Encyclopédie Méthodique, a successor to the Encyclopédie by Denis Diderot.

Panckoucke was born in the city of Lille, where his father André-Joseph Panckoucke (1700–1753) was a writer and book printer. Charles-Joseph settled in Paris in 1754, and established his own bookshop in 1762. He reused many of engraver Robert Bénard's productions to illustrate the works of his catalog.

His first suggestion of a supplement to the Encyclopédie, in 1769 was turned down by Diderot, but Panckoucke  persisted. By 1775, Panckoucke had secured a license to publish his supplement, and it appeared as five volumes in 1776 and 1777. Panckoucke also published two volumes of index to the Encyclopédie, prepared by Pierre Mouchon, and appearing in 1780.

Panckoucke's great effort was the Encyclopédie Méthodique, an expansion and rearrangement of the Encyclopédie, with the subject matter organized by subject area rather than alphabetically. He received the license in 1780, and published a first prospectus in 1782. The work outlived him, with his daughter Thérèse-Charlotte Agasse (widow of Panckoucke's partner Henri Agasse) publishing the last of 166 volumes in 1832.

Shortly before the French Revolution, Panckouke also began publishing the magazine Mercure de France, and established the Moniteur Universel in November 1789. The Mercure de France was a venerable publication of great influence among the French arts and humanities, and it has been called the most important literary journal in prerevolutionary France.  He died, aged 62, in Paris.

Panckoucke's son, Charles Louis Fleury Panckoucke, continued in the writing and publishing business as well.

References

 Robert Collison, Encyclopaedias: Their History Throughout the Ages, 2nd ed. (New York, London: Hafner 1966) pp. 134–135.
 Robert Darton, The business of enlightenment: a publishing history of the Encyclope'die, (Cambridge: The Belknap Press of Harvard University 1979).

1736 births
1798 deaths
Writers from Lille
Charles-Joseph
Newspaper editors of the French Revolution
Burials at Père Lachaise Cemetery
French male essayists
18th-century essayists
18th-century French male writers